China Investment Corporation (CIC) (Chinese: 中国投资有限责任公司; pinyin: zhōngguó tóuzī yǒuxiàn zérèn gōngsī) is a sovereign wealth fund that manages part of the People's Republic of China's foreign exchange reserves. China's largest sovereign wealth fund, CIC was established in 2007 with about US$200 billion of assets under management, a number that grew to US$941 billion in 2017 and US$1.2 trillion in 2021.

History
As of 2007, the People's Republic of China has US$1.4 trillion in currency reserves. (By 2013, US$3.44 trillion.) The China Investment Corporation was established with the intent of using these reserves for the benefit of the state, modeled according to Temasek Holdings of Singapore. The state-owned Central Huijin Investment Corporation was merged into the new company as a wholly owned subsidiary company.

In May 2007 it was reported that CIC was to buy a $3 billion stake in the Blackstone Group.

Special national debt bonds were issued to create the capital that the CIC needed. 1,550.35 billion yuan ($207.91 billion) was issued in this bond sale. The bond process was completed in December 2007. According to Lou Jiwei, the CIC needs to make a profit of 300 million Yuan every day just to pay the interest on the bonds and operation costs. The CIC paid its first interest on the bonds in February 2008 where it paid 12.9 billion yuan.

In 2008, CIC joined the International Forum of Sovereign Wealth Funds and signed up to the Santiago Principles on best practice in managing sovereign wealth funds.

In 2010, CIC established a new subsidiary, CIC International (Hong Kong) Co in Hong Kong and appointed Lawrence Lau as its chairman.

In 2011, CIC established its first foreign office in Toronto, choosing it over financial centres such as New York or London as its first office. Felix Chee will be the chief representative officer

In September 2013, the fund acquire a 12.5% stake in Russian potash fertiliser company Uralkali for a rumoured $2 billion.

In March 2014, the CIC acquired a $40 million stake in iKang Health Group. In October 2015, the CIC provided capital in a deal between Carnival Corporation and China State Shipbuilding Corporation

In October 2015, CSSC Carnival Cruise Shipping, a joint venture between the CIC, the China State Shipbuilding Corporation, and Carnival Corporation & plc, was founded, with operations expected to commence in 2019.

In January 2017, acquired a 45% stake in the office skyscraper 1211 Avenue of the Americas, New York City, which valued the building at $2.3 billion. In November 2017, China Investment Corp. purchased Logicor, a European warehouse company, from The Blackstone Group L.P. for $13.49 billion. Other companies were also bidding for Logicor.

Governance
The management and board of the China Investment Corporation ultimately reports to the State Council of the People's Republic of China. The China Investment Corporation is seen as being "firmly entrenched" in the political establishment as the composition of its board of directors implies "considerable influence on the part of China’s Ministry of Finance."

Board of Directors
Chairman & CEO - Peng Chun
Vice Chairman, President & CIO - Ju Weimin
Executive Director, Executive Vice President & COO - Shen Rujun
Non-Executive Director - Ning Jizhe
Non-Executive Director - Zou Jiayi
Non-Executive Director - Ren Hongbin
Non-Executive Director - Lui Guiping
Non-Executive Director - Lu Lei
Independent Director - Li Jiange
Independent Director - Bai Chong'en
Employee Director - Fan Yong

Board of Supervisors
Chairman of Board of Supervisors - Hu Hao
Supervisor - Qin Boyong
Supervisor - Xiao Yuanqi
Supervisor - Yan Qingmin
Employee Supervisor - Cui Guangqing

Executive committee
Chairman & CEO - Peng Chun
Vice Chairman, President & CIO - Ju Weimin
Chairman of Board of Supervisors - Hu Hao
Executive Director, Executive Vice President & COO - Shen Rujun
Executive Vice President & Deputy CIO - Guo Xiangjun
Executive Vice President & Deputy CIO - Qi Bin
Chief Inspector - Pan Yuehan
Executive Vice President & CSO - Zhao Haiying
Executive Vice President & CRO - Liu Haoling
Member of the Executive Committee - Bao Jianmin
Member of the Executive Committee - Liu Yanbin
Member of the Executive Committee - Xu Zhinbin

International Advisory Council 
 Asia
 Zeng Peiyan (China)
 Shaukat Aziz (Pakistan)
 Justin Yifu Lin (China)
 Frederick Ma (Hong Kong, China)
 Yingyi Qian (China)
 Andrew Sheng (Malaysia)
 Joseph Yam (Hong Kong, China)

 Africa
 Omari Issa (Tanzania)
 John H. Maree (South Africa)

 Americas
 David Denison (Canada)
 Merit E. Janow (United States of America)
 Jorge Paulo Lemann (Brazil)
 John J. Mack (United States of America)
 John L. Thornton (United States of America)

 Europe
 Knut N. Kjaer (Norway)
 Jean Lemierre (France)

 Oceania
 Peter Howard Costello (Australia)

Subsidiaries and minority interests
 GDF Suez Exploration & Production International S.A. (30%; joint venture with Engie)

See also 
 Foreign-exchange reserves of China
 People's Bank of China
 Sovereign wealth fund
 State Administration of Foreign Exchange
 SSBT OD05 Omnibus

References

External links

 
Sovereign wealth funds
Chinese companies established in 2007
Government-owned companies of China
Companies based in Beijing
Financial services companies established in 2008